Levi Stockbridge (March 13, 1820 – May 2, 1904) was a farmer and scientist from Hadley, Massachusetts. He was instrumental in the early history of the Massachusetts Agricultural College now known as the University of Massachusetts Amherst.

Biography
Stockbridge held the following positions with the college:

Farm Superintendent: 1867-1869
Professor: 1867-1879
Acting President: 1876
Fifth President: 1880-1882

He held patents for pioneering experiments in: fertilizer development, nutrient leaching and soil mulching. In 1876 he published Experiments in Feeding Plants. Stockbridge served three terms in the Massachusetts State Legislature, 12 years on the state board of agriculture and for 32 years was a state cattle commissioner. In 1880 he ran for Congress on the Labor-Greenback Party ticket and lost.

The Boltwood-Stockbridge House in Amherst, Massachusetts, is probably the first house built in Amherst and is certainly the oldest remaining and was originally built as the home of Samuel Boltwood. Eventually the Boltwood house and the  farm surrounding the house became part of the Mass Agricultural College. Henry Flagg French, first president of MAC, resided there until he resigned in 1867, after which Stockbridge made the house his residence and office.  Stockbridge Hall, built in 1915 to house the Department of Agriculture, and the Stockbridge School of Agriculture at the University of Massachusetts Amherst also bear his name.

The town of Stockbridge, Georgia, is also named after him.

Selected works
Investigations on Rainfall, Percolation and Evaporation of Water (1879)

References 
Cleary, Vince. Who Was Levi Stockbridge? UMass, Amherst: The Magazine for Alumni & Friends. Winter 2007

Further reading

External links
 

Educators from Massachusetts
American soil scientists
1820 births
1904 deaths
Leaders of the University of Massachusetts Amherst
1872 United States presidential electors
American agriculturalists
People from Hadley, Massachusetts
Stockbridge, Georgia
Academics from Massachusetts
19th-century American educators